Newspapers in Libya are published in the Arabic and English languages.

History
Al Manqab Al Afriqi was the first newspaper in Libya, established in 1827 by the European consuls in Tripoli, and was published in French. In 1866, Tarablos al Gharb by the Wali of the Ottoman Sultanate  was published in Othmani Turkish and Arabic. In 1897, Al Taraqqi was established. Il Giornale de Tripoli was published in Italian by Mohammad Marabet. Majallat Libya al Musawwara was published between 1935 and 1940. As for the Benghazi newspapers, most of them were founded and published after World War II. Benghazi was a city that had more than seven newspapers. Al Haqeeqa, Al Raqeeb, Al Zaman, Reportage, and Barqa were the leading five during the time between the 1950s and the 1970s.

Following the fall of the Gaddafi government in August 2011, former state-affiliated dailies closed and new titles appeared, many short-lived. Benghazi emerged as a publishing hub. , there were few daily newspapers and print runs were small.

Newspapers in the new era
 Al Bayan - Benghazi
 Al Bilad - Tripoli
 Al Haqeeqa - Benghazi
 Al Kalima - Bengazi
 Al Manara - Bengazi
 Al Maydan - Benghazi
 Bernice - Benghazi
 Birniq - Bengazi
 Fabriar - Tripoli
 Hawsh Al Mighar - Derna
 Libya Al Jadida - Tripoli
 Libya Herald - Tripoli, online English-language publication
 Libyan Times - Benghazi
 The Libya Times  - online English-language publication
 The Libya Observer - online English-language publication, since 2014
 Libya Post
 Quryna (Cyrene) - Benghazi
 Tripoli Post - online weekly English-language publication

See also

 Lists of newspapers
 Media of Libya
 Communications in Libya
 Mathaba News Agency

References

External links
 Al-Tadamun News Agency - originally started in Switzerland in February 2011, later moved to Benghazi, Libya 
 Libyan News Agency  ("Lana") - state-run, formerly Jamahiriya News Agency ("Jana")
 Mathaba News Agency - independent pro-Gaddafi news site still in operation
 Tawasul News Agency (TNA) - private news agency, via social media
 Akhbar Libya 24 (AL24) - independent news website, based in Benghazi, publishing in-depth news and reports.
 Libya News - independent news/reports website, based in Tripoli.

Newspapers
Libya